Diego da Silva Reis (born 20 February 1986) is a Brazilian footballer who plays as a forward for Lega Pro Prima Divisione club Prato.

Career
Born in Itapemirim, Espírito Santo, Reis started his career with Rio de Janeiro club Campo Grande. In 2000, he left for Italian team Bologna along with Diego Oliveira and Claiton dos Santos, later moved to Chievo along with Diego Oliveira.

In 2005–06 season he left for Serie C2 side Bellaria – Igea Marina. In the next season he left for Serie C1 club Cremonese. In January 2007, Reis was loaned back to Serie C2, for Prato. The loan was extended in summer 2007 and Reis became a regular starter of the team that season. In June 2008 Prato signed him in co-ownership deal. In 2008–09 season he scored 5 league goals and in June 2009 Prato bought him outright by winning an auction between the two clubs.

References

External links
 Football.it Profile 
 Prato Profile 

Brazilian footballers
Brazilian expatriate footballers
Campo Grande Atlético Clube players
Bologna F.C. 1909 players
A.C. ChievoVerona players
A.C. Bellaria Igea Marina players
U.S. Cremonese players
A.C. Prato players
Association football forwards
Expatriate footballers in Italy
Brazilian expatriate sportspeople in Italy
Sportspeople from Espírito Santo
1986 births
Living people